Eric William Kierans  (February 2, 1914 – May 10, 2004) was a Canadian economist and politician.

Early life
Eric Kierans was born on February 2, 1914, in Montreal, Quebec, Canada, to Irish immigrant parents. He grew up in a working-class neighborhood and attended Loyola College, where he earned a bachelor's degree in commerce. 

After graduation, Kierans worked for several years in the family fur and leather business before leaving to pursue a career in politics. He joined the Liberal Party of Canada and was elected to the House of Commons in 1962, representing the riding of Saint-Laurent.

During his early life, Kierans was a passionate supporter of the cooperative movement and believed in the power of community organizing. He was also deeply committed to social justice issues and worked tirelessly to improve the lives of working-class Canadians.

Throughout his career, Kierans remained true to his principles and was known for his integrity and dedication to public service. He passed away on May 9, 2004, at the age of 90, leaving behind a legacy of leadership and advocacy for the less fortunate.

Career

After serving as director of the school of commerce at McGill University and president of the Montreal Stock Exchange, Kierans entered provincial politics in 1963. Nicknamed the "Socialist Millionaire," he was appointed Minister of Revenue and then Minister of Health in the Quebec Liberal government of Quebec Premier Jean Lesage during the Quiet Revolution.

Kierans became president of the Quebec Liberal Party and clashed with former cabinet minister and colleague René Lévesque in 1967, daring him to give up the idea of Quebec separatism or quit the Liberal Party. Lévesque later quit the Liberal Party and established the Mouvement Souveraineté-Association, which became Quebec's leading sovereigntist party as the Parti Québécois.

Initially a critic of Walter L. Gordon's economic nationalism, Kierans' experience in government changed his mind, and he became a believer in the need for state intervention in the economy.

In 1968, Kierans entered federal politics running unsuccessfully for the leadership of the Liberal Party of Canada at its 1968 leadership convention. He was elected to the House of Commons in the 1968 federal election. Kierans served as Postmaster-General and Minister of Communications in the cabinet of Prime Minister Pierre Trudeau. He did not run for re-election in the 1972 election, partly as a result of his criticisms of Trudeau's economic policy.

Kierans called for Canada to leave the North Atlantic Treaty Organization (NATO) in 1969. He argued that the organization might have served a useful purpose on its initial formation but had since become anachronistic. Some others with the Trudeau government agreed with Kierans, but others strongly disagreed. The Trudeau government ultimately kept Canada in NATO but reduced Canada's troop deployment.

He considered running for the leadership of the New Democratic Party in 1975 but declined in favour of Ed Broadbent.

After leaving politics, Kierans taught at McGill and Dalhousie University. In the 1980s, he became a familiar voice appearing  with Dalton Camp and Stephen Lewis as part of a weekly political panel on Peter Gzowski's Canadian Broadcasting Corporation radio show, Morningside.

In 1994, he was made an Officer of the Order of Canada.

Archives 
There is an Eric William Kierans fonds at Library and Archives Canada.

References

External links
Eric Kierans, 90 Globe and Mail obituary
Eric Kierans, 90: Politician respected for candour Toronto Star obituary
Order of Canada Citation

1914 births
2004 deaths
Anglophone Quebec people
Canadian economists
Canadian nationalists
Academic staff of the Dalhousie University
Liberal Party of Canada leadership candidates
Liberal Party of Canada MPs
Members of the House of Commons of Canada from Quebec
Members of the King's Privy Council for Canada
Academic staff of McGill University
Officers of the Order of Canada
Politicians from Montreal
Postmasters General of Canada
Quebec Liberal Party MNAs